Graceland is an American police drama television series created by Jeff Eastin that premiered on the USA Network on June 6, 2013. A group of undercover agents from various law enforcement agencies in the United States, including the DEA, the FBI, and ICE, live together in a confiscated Southern California beach house known as "Graceland". Rookie FBI agent Mike Warren is assigned to the house fresh out of Quantico training.

On October 1, 2015, USA Network canceled Graceland after three seasons.

Series overview

Episodes

Season 1 (2013)

Season 2 (2014)

Season 3 (2015)

On November 11, 2014, Graceland was renewed by USA Network for a third season consisting of 13 episodes.

References

External links
 
 

Lists of American crime drama television series episodes